Carhuamayo (from Quechua Qarwa Mayu or Qarwamayu: qarwa yellowish, mayu river, "yellowish river") is one of four districts of the Junín Province in Peru.

Geography 
Other mountains are listed below:

 Puka Shalla
 Rinri Uchku
 Runtunniyuq
 Sankhayuq
 Wanin Punta

See also 
 Yanaqucha

References